
Gmina Kotla is a rural gmina (administrative district) in Głogów County, Lower Silesian Voivodeship, in south-western Poland.

The local economy is based on agriculture and minor industry.

Neighbouring gminas
Gmina Kotla is bordered by the town of Głogów and the gminas of Głogów, Siedlisko, Sława, Szlichtyngowa and Żukowice.

Villages
The gmina contains the villages of Bogomice, Ceber, Chociemyśl, Dorzecze, Głogówko, Grochowice, Kotla, Kozie Doły, Krążkówko, Krzekotówek, Kulów, Leśna Dolina, Moszowice, Pękoszów, Skidniów, Skidniówek, Skórzyn, Sobczyce, Zabiele and Zakrzów.

References

Kotla
Głogów County